Summer Strike is a 2022 South Korean television series starring Kim Seol-hyun and Im Si-wan. It is based on a webtoon of the same Korean title by writer Joo Young-hyun. The series is an original drama of Genie TV, and is be available for streaming on its platform and on OTT media service Seezn. It also aired on ENA's Mondays and Tuesdays at 21:20 (KST) time slot, from November 21 to December 27, 2022.

Synopsis
Summer Strike is about people who start finding themselves after leaving their lifestyles in a complicated city, and moving to an unfamiliar place to do nothing.

Cast

Main
 Kim Seol-hyun as Lee Yeo-reum: a 28-year-old woman who decides to quit her job of five years and move to a small seaside town called Angok.
 Im Si-wan as Ahn Dae-beom: a librarian at Angok Library who is a math genius.

Supporting
 Shin Eun-soo as Kim Bom
 Bang Jae-min as Heo Jae-hoon
 Park Ye-young as Jo Ji-young
 Kwak Min-gyu as Bae Sung-min
 Kim Joon as Bae Joon

Extended
 Park Ok-chul as Song Ok-soon
 Kim Yo-han as Hwang Geun-ho
 Oh Yong as Chang-su
 Im Jae-hyuk as Dae-ho
 Park Ji-hoon

Production
The series is co-written and co-directed by Lee Yoon-jung and Hong Moon-pyo.

The first script reading of the cast was held in April 2022. Filming was conducted for six months in several locations including Gurye, Gokseong, and Namhae.

Ratings

Notes

References

External links
  
 
 
 

Korean-language television shows
ENA television dramas
Television shows based on South Korean webtoons
South Korean melodrama television series
South Korean romance television series
2022 South Korean television series debuts
2022 South Korean television series endings